The International Axion Observatory (IAXO) is a next-generation axion helioscope for the search of solar axions and axion-like particles. It is the follow-up of the CERN Axion Solar Telescope (CAST), which has been operating since 2003. The IAXO will be set up by implementing the helioscope concept used in the CAST experiment to its largest possible size.

The Letter of Intent for International Axion Observatory was submitted to the CERN SPS committee in August 2013. IAXO formally founded in July 2017 and received an advanced grant from the European Research Council in October 2018. The near-term goal of the collaboration is to build a scaled-down prototype version of the experiment, called Baby-IAXO, which is under discussion for a possible location at DESY, Germany.

Baby IAXO 
Baby IAXO is a prototype, scaled-down version of all the subsystems of the IAXO. The prototype is a testing version and will serve as an intermediate step to explore further possible improvements to the real IAXO. Baby IAXO would be set up in Hamburg, Germany by the CERN and DESY collaboration. CERN would be responsible for giving in the design reports of prototype magnets and cryostat, and DESY would design and construct the movable platform along with the other infrastructure. The data taking by Baby IAXO is scheduled to start in 2025, and consecutively IAXO will be operational from 2028.

Physics potential 
IAXO will primarily be hunting the solar axions, along with the potential to observe the Quantum chromodynamics (QCD) axion in the mass range of 1meV to 1eV. It is also expected to be capable of discovering axion-like particles (known as the ALPs) coupled either with photons or electrons.  

The QCD-axions and the ALPs are predicted to have quite similar properties, and hence the IAXO whose primary goal is to observe the solar axions and photon-coupled ALPs will also be able to detect the QCD axions and ALPs from different unexplored astrophysical axion sources. It, therefore, has the potential to solve both the strong CP problem and the dark matter problem, which depends on the discovery of the axion particles.

The IAXO is believed to be the most ambitious experiment among the current-day experiment set-ups to observe the hypothetical axions. It could also be later implemented to test models of hypothesized hidden photons or chameleons.

Experimental setup 
The IAXO will be primarily based on an improved helioscope, with a signal to noise ratio of five orders of magnitude higher compared to current-day detectors. The crossectional area of the magnet equipped with an X-ray focus optics is meant to increase this signal to background ratio. When the solar axions come in contact with the magnetic crosssection, they are converted into photons through the Primakoff effect. These photons would then be detected by X-ray detectors placed on the telescope. This implies that a larger magnetic cross-section will lead to a more intense signal.

The magnetic subsystem will also be equipped with a mechanical system allowing it to follow the sun consistently throughout the day, leading to enhanced exposure. The IAXO subsystems comprising magnets, optics, and detectors are planned to be fully optimized for solar axion detectors.

The sensitivity of the axion-photon coupling measurement in IAXO would be 1-1.5 order of magnitude higher than that achieved by previous detectors such as CAST.

The central magnetic systems will have a large superconducting magnet, configured in a toroidal multibore manner, in order to generate a strong magnetic field over a larger volume. It will be a 25 long magnet, 5.3 m diameter toroid composed of 8 different coils. This configuration is calculated to generate a 2.5 Tesla magnetic field within a 600 mm diameter. The said magnetic subsystem is inspired by the ATLAS experiment.

IAXO optics will be inspired by NASA's NuStar X-ray satellite.

Sources accessible to IAXO 
Any particle found by IAXO will be at the least a sub-dominant component of the Dark Matter. The observatory would be capable of observing from a wide range of sources given below.

 Quantum chromodynamics Axions
 Dark matter Axions
 Solar axions
 Axions from astrophysical cooling anomalies such as white dwarf cooling, neutron star cooling, globular clusters, supergiant stars powered by helium.

See also 

 CERN Axion Solar Telescope

External links 

 International Axion Observatory Website

References 

List of experiments for dark matter search
CERN experiments
Particle physics facilities
Physics experiments
CERN facilities
CERN